Independent Division of Guizhou Provincial Military District(1st Formation) was formed on June 6th 1966. The division was composed of three infantry regiments, an infantry battalion and an antiaircraft artillery battalion. 

From January 5th 1968 to 1969 its Antiaircraft Artillery Battalion participated in the Vietnam War, taking part in air defense missions in Lai Châu province. During its deployment the battalion shot down 4 US aircraft and damaged other 5.

The division was disbanded on July 27th 1976.

References

Independent divisions of the People's Liberation Army
Military units and formations established in 1966
Military units and formations disestablished in 1976